John Templeton (1766–1825) was a pioneering Irish naturalist, sometimes referred to as the "Father of Irish Botany". He was a leading figure in Belfast's late eighteenth century enlightenment,initially supported the  United Irishmen, and figured prominently in the town's scientific and literary societies.

Family
Templeton was born in Belfast in 1766, the son of James Templeton, a prosperous wholesale merchant, and his wife Mary Eleanor, daughter of Benjamin Legg, a sugar refiner. The family resided in a 17th century country house to the south of the town, which been named Orange Grove in honour of William of Orange who had stopped at the house en route to his victory over James II at the Battle of the Boyne in 1690.

Until the age of 16 Templeton attended a progressive, co-educational, school favoured by the town's liberal, largely Presbyterian, merchant class. Schoolmaster David Manson sought to exclude "drudgery and fear" by combining classroom instruction with play and experiential learning. Templeton counted among his schoolfellows brother and sister Henry Joy and Mary Ann McCracken, and maintained a warm friendship with them throughout his life.

In 1799, Templeton married Katherine Johnson of Seymour Hill. Her family had been touched by the United Irish rebellion the previous year: her brother-in-law, Henry Munro, commander of the United army at the Battle of Ballynahinch, had been hanged. The couple had five children: Ellen, born on 30 September 1800, Robert, born on 12 December 1802, Catherine, born on 19 July 1806, Mary, born on 9 December 1809 and Matilda on 2 November 1813.

The union between the two already prosperous merchant families provided more than ample means enabling Templeton to devote himself passionately to the study of natural history.

United Irishman

Like many of his liberal Presbyterian peers in Belfast, Templeton was sympathetic to the programme and aims of the Society United Irishmen, established in 1791 in the early years of the French Revolution. It was several years, however, before his support for Catholic Emancipation and for a democratic reform of the Irish Parliament in Dublin, persuaded him to take the United Irish "test" or pledge. In March 1797 his friend, Mary Ann McCracken, wrote to her brother: [A] certain Botanical friend of ours whose steady and inflexible mind is invulnerable to any other weapon but reason, and only to be moved by conviction has at last turned his attention from the vegetable kingdom to the human species and after pondering the matter for some months, is at last determined to become what he ought to have been months ago.
She hoped his sisters would "soon follow him." Having committed himself to the patriotic union of Catholic, Protestant and Dissenter, Templeton changed the name of the family home from loyalist Orange Grove to Irish "Cranmore" (crann mór, 'big tree').

Templeton was not involved in the Rebellion of 1798, and was repelled by the violence. He nonetheless withdrew from the Belfast Literary Society, of which he had been a founding member in 1801, rather than accept the continued presence of Dr. James MacDonnell. MacDonnell's offence had been to subscribe forty guineas in 1803 for the capture (leading to execution) of the unreformed rebel Thomas Russell who had been their mutual friend. (While unable to "forget the amiable Russell", time, he conceded,  "softened a little my feelings": in 1825, Templeton and MacDonnell met and shook hands).

Garden

The garden at Cranmore spread over 13-acre garden was planted with exotic and native species acquired on botanical excursions, from fellow botanists , nurseries, botanical gardens and abroad: “Received yesterday a large chest of East Indian plants which I examined today." " Box from Mr. Taylor".Other plants arrived, often as seeds from North America, Australia, India, China and other parts of the British Empire  Cranmore also served as a small animal farm.for experimental animal husbandry.

Botanist 

John Templeton's interest in botany began with this experimental garden laid out according to a suggestion in Rousseau's 'Nouvelle Heloise' and following Rousseau's 'Letters on the Elements of Botany Here he cultivated many tender exotics out of doors (a list provided by Nelson  and began botanical studies which lasted throughout his life and corresponded with the most eminent botanists in England Sir William Hooker, William Turner, James Sowerby and, especially Sir Joseph Banks, who had travelled on Captain James Cook's voyages, and in charge of Kew Gardens. Banks tried (unsuccessfully) to tempt him to New Holland (Australia) as a botanist on the Flinders's Expedition with the offer of a large tract of land and a substantial salary. An associate of the Linnean Society, Templeton visited London and saw the botanical work being achieved there. This led to his promotion of the Belfast Botanic Gardens as early as 1809, and to work on a Catalogue of Native Irish Plants, in manuscript form and now in the Royal Irish Academy, which was used as an accurate foundation for later work by succeeding Irish botanists. He also assembled text and executed many beautiful watercolour drawings for a Flora Hibernica, sadly never finished, and kept a detailed journal during the years 1806–1825 (both now in the Ulster Museum, Belfast). Of the 12000 algal specimens in the Ulster Museum Herbarium about 148 are in the Templeton collection and were mostly collected by him, some were collected by others and passed to Templeton. The specimens in the Templeton collection in the Ulster Museum (BEL) have been catalogued. Those noted in 1967 were numbered: F1 – F48. Others were in The Queen's University Belfast. All of Templeton's specimens have now been numbered in the Ulster Museum as follows: F190 – F264; F290 – F314 and F333 – F334.

Templeton was the first finder of Rosa hibernicaThis rose, although collected by Templeton in 1795, remained undescribed until 1803 when he published a short diagnosis in the Transactions of the Dublin Society.

Early additions to the flora of Ireland include Sisymbrium Ligusticum seoticum (1793), Adoxa moschatellina (1820), Orobanche rubra and many other plants.His work on lichens was the basis of this secton of Flora Hiberica by James Townsend Mackay who wrote of him The foregoing account of the Lichens of Ireland would have been still more incomplete, but for the extensive collection of my lamented friend, the late Mr. John Templeton, of Cranmore, near Belfast, which his relict, Mrs. Templeton, most liberally placed at my disposal. I believe that thirty years ago his acquirements in the Natural History of organised beings rivalled that of any individual in Europe : these were by no means limited to diagnostic marks, but extended to all the laws and modifications of the living force. The frequent quotation of his authority in every preceding department of this Flora, is but a brief testimony of his diversified knowledge

Botanical Manuscripts
The MSS. left by Templeton consist of seven volumes. One of these is a small 8vo. half bound ; it is in the Library of the Royal Irish Academy, and contains 280 pp. of lists of Cryptogams, chiefly mosses, with their localities. In this book is inserted a letter from Miss F. M. More, sister of Alexander Goodman More, to Dr. Edward Perceval Wright, Secretary, Royal Irish Academy, dated March, 1897, in which she says—‘*‘ The Manuscript which accompanies this letter was drawn up between 1794 and 1810, by the eminent naturalist, John Templeton, in Belfast. It was lent by his son, Dr. R. Templeton, to my brother, Alex. G. More, when he was preparing the second edition of the ‘ Cybele Hibernica,’ on condition that it should be placed in the Library of the Royal Irish Academy afterwards.” The other six volumes are quarto size, and contain 1,090 folios, with descriptions of many of the plants, and careful drawings in pen and pencil and colours of many species. They are now lent to the Belfast Museum. About ten years ago I [Lett]spent a week in examining these volumes, and as their contents have hitherto never been fully described, I would like to give an epitome of my investigation of them.
 Vol. 1.—Phanerogams, 186 folios, with 15 coloured figures, and 6 small drawings in the text.
 Vol. Il.—Fresh-water Algae, 246 folios, 71 of which are coloured.
 Vol.IIl.—Marine Algae, 212 folios, of which 79 are coloured figures. At the end of this volume are 3 folios of Mosses, the pagination of which runs with the rest of this volume, but it is evident they had at some time been misplaced.
 Vol. IV Fungi, 112 folios.
 Vol. V.—Mosses, 117 folios, of which 20 are coloured, and also 73 small drawings in the text. *Vol. VI.—Mosses and Hepatics. 117 folios are Hepatics, 40 of which are in colours ; 96 folios are Mosses, of which 39 are full-page coloured figures; and in addition there are 3 small coloured drawings in the text.

All these drawings were executed by Templeton himself, they are every one most accurately and beautifully drawn; and the colouring is true to nature and artistically finished; those of the mosses and hepatics being particularly good. Templeton is not mentioned in Tate’s ‘‘ Flora Belfastiensis,’ published in 1863, at Belfast. The earliest published reference to his MSS. is in the “* Flora of Ulster,” by Dickie, published in 1864, where there is this indefinite allusion—‘* To the friends of the late Mr. Templeton I am indebted for permission to take notes of species recorded in his manuscript.” The MS. was most likely the small volume now in the Royal Irish Academy Library. In the introduction to the “*‘ Flora of the North-east of Ireland”’ (1888), there is a brief biographical sketch of Templeton, but no mention of any MS. However, in a ‘‘ Supplement” to the Flora (1894), there is this note— ‘* Templeton, John, four volumes of his ‘ Flora Hibernica’ at present deposited with the Belfast Natural History and Philosophical Society, contain much original matter, which could not be worked out in time for the present paper.” This fixes the approximate date of the MSS. being loaned to the Belfast Museum. They were not known to the authors of the ‘‘ Cybele Hibernica’”’ in 1866, while in the second edition (1898) the small volume of the MSS. in R.1.A. Library is described in the Index of Authors under its full title—Catalogue of the Native Plants of Ireland, by John Templeton, A.L.S.

Natural History of Ireland

John Templeton had wide-ranging scientific interests including chemistry as it applied to agriculture and horticulture, meteorology and phenology following Robert Marsham. He published very little aside from monthly reports on natural history and meteorology in the 'Belfast Magazine' commenced in 1808. John Templeton studied birds extensively, collected shells, marine organisms (especially zoophytes and insects, notably garden pest species. He planned a 'Hibernian Fauna' to accompany 'Hibernian Flora'. This was not published, even in part, but A catalogue of the species annulose animals and of rayed ones found in Ireland as selected from the papers of the late J Templeton Esq. of Cranmore with localities, descriptions, and illustrations Mag. Nat. Hist. 9: 233- 240; 301 305; 417–421; 466 -472 , 1836.  Catalogue of Irish Crustacea, Myriapoda and Arachnoida, selected from the papers of the late John Templeton Esq. Mag. Nat. Hist. 9: 9–14 .and 1837 [https://en.wikisource.org/wiki/Irish_Vertebrate_Animals:_selected_from_the_Papers_of_John_Templeton Irish Vertebrate animals selected from the papers of the late. John Templeton Esq] Mag. Nat. Hist . 1: (n. s. ): 403–413 403 -413 were (collated and edited By Robert Templeton). Much of his work was used by later authors, especially by William Thompson whose 'The Natural History of Ireland' is its essential continuation.

Death and legacy
Never of strong constitution, he was not expected to survive, he was in failing health from 1815 and died in 1825 aged only 60, "leaving a sorrowing wife, youthful family and many friends and townsmen who greatly mourned his death". The Australian leguminous genus Templetonia is named for him.

In 1810 Templeton had supported the veteran United Irishman, William Drennan, in the foundation of the Belfast Academical Institution. With the staff and scholars of the Institution's early Collegiate Department, he then helped form the Belfast Natural History and Philosophical Society (the origin of both the Botanical Gardens and what is now the Ulster Museum).

Although always ready to communicate his own findings, Templeton did not publish much. Robert Lloyd Praeger (1865-1953), editor of the Irish Naturalist and President of the Royal Irish Academy, described him nonetheless as "the most eminent naturalist Ireland has produced".

Templeton's son, Robert Templeton (1802-1892), educated at the Belfast Academical Institution (which was eventually to acquire Cranmore House), became an entomologist renowned for his work on Sri Lankan arthropods.

Contacts
 Thomas Martyn From 1794 supplied Martyn with many remarks on cultivation for Martyn's edition of Miller's Gardener's Dictionary.
 George Shaw
 James Edward Smith Contributions to English Botany and Flora Britannica
 James Lee
 Samuel Goodenough
 Aylmer Bourke Lambert
 James Sowerby
 William Curtis
 Joseph Banks
 Robert Brown.
 Lewis Weston Dillwyn's Contributions to British Confervæ (1802–07)
 Dawson Turner Contributions to British Fuci (1802), and Muscologia Hibernica (1804).
 John Walker
 Francis Rawdon-Hastings, 1st Marquess of Hastings
 John Foster, 1st Baron Oriel
 Jonathan Stokes
 Walter Wade

Other
John Templeton maintained a natural history cabinet containing specimens from Calobar, New Holland and The Carolinas as well as is Ireland cabinets. His library included Rees's Cyclopædia and works by Carl Linnaeus, Edward Donovan and William Swainson s:Zoological Illustrationsand he used a John Dollond microscope and lenses.

Gallery

|

See also
 Late Enlightenment
 James Townsend Mackay

References

General references
 Thomas Dix Hincks Biography of J. Templeton, Esq. The Magazine of Natural History (Loudon) 1828 Volume 1: 403–406 continued 1829 Volume 2: 305–310 
 Kertland, M.P.H. 1966. Bi-centenary of the birth of John Templeton, A.L.S. 1766–1825. Irish Naturalists' Journal 15 :229 -232. Pl.4.
 Kertland, M.P.H. 1967. The specimens of Templeton's algae in the Queen's University Herbarium. Irish Naturalists' Journal 15: 318 – 322.
 Pilcher, B. 1967. The algae of John Templeton in the Ulster Museum. Irish Naturalist Journals 15''': 350 – 353.
 Praeger, R.L.,1950 Some Irish Naturalists. W. Tempest, Dundalgan Press, Dundalk.
 Ross, H.C.G. and Nash, R. 1985. The development of natural history in early nineteenth century Ireland. Linnaeus to Darwin: commentaries on the history of biology and geology.'' Society for the History of Natural History, London. 1985.

Further reading

External links
 John Templeton Diaries

1766 births
1825 deaths
19th-century Irish botanists
Fellows of the Linnean Society of London
Scientists from Belfast
United Irishmen
18th-century Irish botanists